Leytonstone School is a coeducational community secondary school located on Colworth Road in Leytonstone, London, England.

Admissions 
The school formerly specialised in Business and Enterprise. The school numbers 971 students, as of the last Ofsted inspection of the school in 2021.

History

Originally a grammar school called Leyton County High School for Girls, the buildings at the junction of Colworth Road and Forest Road on the edge of Epping Forest were opened in 1911; girls were transferred there from the private Elson House Girls High School in Wallwood Road and from the mixed Leyton and Leytonstone high schools. The school was built on the site of Forest Farm and was designed in the Tudor style by  William Jacques ARIBA, who was the architect for the Leyton Urban District Council.

In 1968, it was renamed Leyton Senior High School for Girls when it became a comprehensive school for 14- to 18-year-old girls. In the 1980s, it became a mixed comprehensive under a borough re-organisation of schools and changed name to Leytonstone School.

Business and Enterprise specialist school status was achieved in 2007. Successful  re-designation in 2008 enabled Leytonstone to retain this specialism and acquire a further specialism, 'Leadership Partners' in February 2009. It has also been designated an HPSS (high performing specialist school).

Alumni

Leytonstone School

Leyton County High School for Girls
 Sonita Alleyne, OBE, FRSA, co-founder and former CEO of Somethin’ Else, a media production company, and Master of Jesus College, Cambridge. She is the first black master of any Oxbridge college 
 Dame Sharon Michele White DBE, Chairman of the John Lewis Partnership and former Chief Executive of the British media regulator Ofcom. She was the first black person, and the second woman, to become a Permanent Secretary at the Treasury.

References

External links
 School website
  OFSTED report
 EduBase

1911 establishments in England
Secondary schools in the London Borough of Waltham Forest
Educational institutions established in 1911
Community schools in the London Borough of Waltham Forest
Leytonstone